The South London Storm Academy is the youth team set-up for South London Storm rugby league club. It is for players aged 16 to 18 and was established in May 2008 in association with the  Jack Petchey Foundation.

History
The South London Storm Rugby League Academy was launched in May 2008 with the support of a £10,000 grant from the  Jack Petchey Foundation.

The initial three-year plan will see Storm working with a number of local 6th forms and colleges including St Joseph's College in Upper Norwood, Carshalton Boys Sports College and Croydon College.

The idea a behind the academy is that the inductees will gain much more than just playing rugby league. The backing of the Jack Petchey Foundation has enabled the club to introduce a programme that can help prepare the participants for a career in sport and in which they will learn about how to look after themselves through living a healthier lifestyle. The players will be encouraged to gain Level 1 coaching badges and qualify as referees, and they will then be placed with the junior clubs in the South London rugby league structure to gain experience. In addition they will be given advice on nutrition, injury prevention and sports psychology.

The first Academy intake was announced in January 2009.

The scheme is administered from the South London Community Rugby League office at St Joseph's College (Boys) in Upper Norwood.

Personnel
Academy Head Coach
Lee McCarthy

Academy Assistant Coach
Adam Tran

Academy Team Manager
Giovanni Cinque

South London Rugby League Structure

See also

Other South London Development Clubs
South London Storm
Croydon Hurricanes
Brixton Bulls
Addington Lightning
Wandsworth Whirlwinds
Thornton Heath Tornadoes
South London Thunderbirds

About Rugby League
Rugby League Rules
Playing Rugby League
List of rugby league terms
Rugby league positions

External links
South London Storm Official Site
Rugby Football League's Safeguarding & Child Protection policy
Jack Petchey Foundation

Rugby league teams in London
Rugby clubs established in 2008